La Verrière is a railway station serving La Verrière, a western suburb of Paris, France. It is situated on the Paris–Brest railway. It is served by Transilien Line N trains from Paris-Montparnasse to Rambouillet, and it is the terminus of Transilien Line U from La Défense.

External links
 

Railway stations in Yvelines
Railway stations in France opened in 1849